Trammell is both a surname and a given name. Notable people with the name include:

Given name
Trammell Crow (born 1914), American property developer

Surname
Alan Trammell (born 1958), American baseball shortstop
Austin Trammell (born 1998), American football player
Bobby Lee Trammell (1934–2008), American rockabilly singer and politician
Bubba Trammell (born 1971), American baseball outfielder
Charles M. Trammell (1886–1967), judge of the United States Board of Tax Appeals
Dennis Trammell (born 1982), American basketball player
Jeffrey Trammell (born 1950), American lobbyist and political consultant
Joel Trammell, (born 1965) American businessman
Lloyd Trammell (born 1953), American inventor
Park Trammell (1876–1936), American politician
Pat Trammell (1940–1968), All-American quarterback
Sam Trammell (born 1969), American actor
Taylor Trammell (born 1997), American baseball outfielder
Terrence Trammell (born 1978), African American track and field athlete

German-language surnames